Schuettea is a genus of moonyfishes native to the eastern Indian Ocean and the southwestern Pacific Ocean.

Species
There are currently two recognized species in this genus:
 Schuettea scalaripinnis Steindachner, 1866 (Eastern pomfret)
 Schuettea woodwardi (Waite, 1905) (Woodward's pomfret)

References

Monodactylidae
Marine fish genera
Taxa named by Franz Steindachner